Good Morning, My Dear Wife (Egyptian Arabic: صباح الخير يا زوجتي العزيزة translit: Sabah El Kheir ya Zawgaty El Aziza) is a 1969 Egyptian film starring Salah Zulfikar, Nelly. The film is written by Samy Amin and directed by Abdel Moneim Shokry.

Synopsis 
The two spouses, Hassan and Samia, who are happily married, and their lives are disturbed by some of Samia's mother's harassment, who dislikes Hassan and wants her daughter to leave him and marry her cousin who loved her from childhood. Then they have their first child and start trying to face problems in dealing with nannies and trying to hold on their jobs.

Primary cast 

 Salah Zulfikar as Hassan
 Nelly as Samia
 Taheyya Kariokka as Samia’s mother
 Nabil Al-Hagrasy as Hanafy
 Fathia Chahine as School principal
 Zeinat Olwi as The dancer
 Fahmy Aman as Ragab
 Kawthar Al-Asal as Karima
 Khairiya Ahmed in a cameo appearance
 Hussein Ismail
 Laila Yousry
 Hassan Hussein
 Wahid Saif

See also 
 Egyptian cinema
 List of Egyptian films of 1969

References

External links 
 Good Morning, My Dear Wife on elCinema

1969 films
1960s Arabic-language films
20th-century Egyptian films
Egyptian black-and-white films
Egyptian romantic comedy films
Films shot in Egypt